Jones's Mill is an 11.6 hectare biological Site of Special Scientific Interest near Pewsey in Wiltshire, notified in 1975.

The site is managed as a nature reserve by Wiltshire Wildlife Trust.

Sources
 Natural England citation sheet for the site (accessed 7 April 2022)

External links
 Jones's Mill - Wiltshire Wildlife Trust
 Natural England website (SSSI information)

Kennet and Avon Canal
Sites of Special Scientific Interest in Wiltshire
Sites of Special Scientific Interest notified in 1975
Wiltshire Wildlife Trust reserves